Nationalism and sport are often intertwined, as sports provide a venue for symbolic competition between nations; sports competition often reflects national conflict, and in fact has often been a tool of diplomacy. The involvement of political goals in sport is seen by some as contrary to the fundamental ethos of sport being carried on for its own sake, for the enjoyment of its participants, but this involvement has been true throughout the history of sport.

Sports diplomacy 

Most sports are contested between national teams, which encourages the use of sporting events for nationalist purposes, whether intentionally or not. The signalling of national solidarity through sport is one of the primary forms of banal nationalism.

Several sporting events are a matter of national pride; The Ashes is a matter of national pride between England and Australia. Also in cricket an India versus Pakistan match puts both countries on a virtual standstill as if it were all about national pride during those matches.

The Olympic Games are the premier stage for nationalist competition, and its history reflects the history of political conflict since its inception at the end of the 19th century. The 1936 Summer Olympics held in Berlin was an illustration, maybe best acknowledged in hindsight, where an ideology was developing which used the event to strengthen its spread through propaganda.  The boycott by the United States and politically aligned nations of the 1980 Summer Olympics and the Soviet Union and politically aligned nations of the 1984 Summer Olympics were part of the Cold War conflict.

When apartheid was the official policy in South Africa, many sportspeople adopted the conscientious approach that they should not appear in competitive sports there. Some feel this was an effective contribution to the eventual demolition of the policy of apartheid, others feel that it may have prolonged and reinforced its worst effects. Many African nations boycotted the 1976 Summer Olympics in Montreal, as a result of then New Zealand Prime Minister Rob Muldoon allowing the All Blacks to tour South Africa. The issue would later come to a head during the 1981 Springbok Tour.

George Orwell's essay "The Sporting Spirit" examines the effect nationalism plays on sport, where Orwell argues that various sporting events trigger violence between groups for the very reason of competition.

Nationalistic sports 

In the history of Ireland, Gaelic sports were clearly carried on with nationalist overtones: for example, for most of the last century a person could have been banned from playing Gaelic football, hurling, or other sport, if the person was seen to have played Association football, cricket, rugby or any other game which was of British origin.

The nationalistic Italian fascists also created Volata as their own home-grown alternative to soccer and rugby. It was intended to be a replacement for the popular games perceived to be of British origin that would be of a more local character, tracing its heritage back to the earlier Italian games of Harpastum and Calcio Fiorentino. However, unlike its Gaelic equivalents, Volata was short-lived and is no longer played.

Clubs as symbols of rival communities 

In Scotland, the Old Firm derby in Glasgow featuring Celtic, historically linked to the city's Catholic community, and Rangers, similarly linked to the city's Protestant community, have also historically seen trends along ethno-political lines.

The policy of Spanish football team Athletic Bilbao of picking only Basque players is strongly linked to Basque nationalism. This causes disputes between Athletic Bilbao and other Basque teams due to the Bilbao squad being able to use their economic power to purchase players who play for other important Basque teams who have strong youth ranks, such as CA Osasuna and Real Sociedad. In the same vein, FC Barcelona have since the late 1990s promoted from youth ranks a series of Catalan players such as Xavi and Carles Puyol. Indeed, the club is widely seen as the de facto representative of Catalonia, extending the Autonomous Community's reach to areas it otherwise would not be able to influence. However, their local rivals RCD Espanyol usually field more Catalan players than FC Barcelona and the best Catalan goalscorer in La Liga history Raúl Tamudo came through their youth ranks.

In Yugoslavia, NK Dinamo Zagreb and Red Star Belgrade were seen as symbols of Croatian and Serbian nationalism, respectively. On 13 May 1990, due to the rise of nationalism in the wake of the breakup of the country, an infamous riot broke out between the clubs' ultras during a league game in Zagreb.

In Canada, the Montreal Canadiens, the world's oldest and most successful professional ice hockey team, has always been a symbol for Francophone Quebeckers in Montreal. The teams has had rivalries in succession with the Anglophone Quebec's Montreal Wanderers and Montreal Maroons, as well as English Canada's Toronto Maple Leafs.  As well, from 1975 to 1995 there was a rivalry with the Quebec Nordiques from Quebec City, which took on political overtones, with Canadiens fans being more likely to be Liberals and federalists, and Nordiques fans more likely Pequists and sovereigntists.

See also

 Nationalism#Sport
Racism in sport
Antisemitism in the Olympic Games
Boycotts of Israel in sports
Rugby union and apartheid
Association football and politics

References

Further reading
 Abbassi, Driss.  "Le sport dans l'empire français: un instrument de domination?." Outre-mers 96.364 (2009): 5-15. online
 Amin, Nasser. 'Football And Flags'. CounterCurrents. September 22, 2006.
 Arnold, R. (2020). "Nationalism and Sport: A Review of the Field." Nationalities Papers.
 Bairner, Alan. Sport, nationalism, and globalization: European and North American perspectives (2001).
 Fernández L’Hoeste, H.  et al. Sports and Nationalism in Latin/o America (2015).
 Gems, Gerald R. Sport and the American Occupation of the Philippines: Bats, Balls, and Bayonets (Rowman & Littlefield, 2016) 203 pp. 
 Jarvie, Grant.  "Internationalism and Sport in the Making of Nations."  Identities: Global Studies in Culture and Power 10.4 (2003): 537-551. 
 Jarvie, Grant. Sport, culture and society: an introduction (Routledge, 2013).

 McDevitt, P. May the Best Man Win: Sport, Masculinity, and Nationalism in Great Britain and the Empire, 1880-1935 (2008).
 Ok, Gwang.  Transformation of Modern Korean Sport: Imperialism, Nationalism, Globalization (2007).
 Perkin, Harold. "Teaching the nations how to play: sport and society in the British empire and Commonwealth." International Journal of the History of Sport 6#2 (1989): 145-155.

External links
Nationalism, Competition, and Diplomacy: Asia at the 2012 London Olympics, Interview with Victor Cha (July 24, 2012)
 Nagy, Peter Tibor 'To the history of sport politics and physical education in Hungary between the world wars 1920-1944', John Wesley College, Budapest.

Sport
Politics and sports